Beautiful, an adjective used to describe things as possessing beauty, may refer to:

Film and theater
 Beautiful (2000 film), an American film directed by Sally Field
 Beautiful (2008 film), a South Korean film directed by Juhn Jai-hong
 Beautiful (2009 film), an Australian film directed by Dean O'Flaherty
 Beautiful (2011 film), an Indian Malayalam-language film directed by V. K. Prakash
 Beautiful: The Carole King Musical, a 2014 Broadway musical

Music
 The Beautiful (band), an American rock band 1988–1993

Albums
 Beautiful (Candido Camero album) or the title song, 1970
Beautiful!, by Charles McPherson, 1975
 Beautiful (David Tao album), 2006
 Beautiful (Fantastic Plastic Machine album), 2001
 Beautiful (Fish Leong album), 2003
 Beautiful (Jessica Mauboy album) or the title song (see below), 2013
 Beautiful (Meg album) or the title song, 2009
 Beautiful (The Reels album), 1982
 Beautiful (Teena Marie album) or the title song, 2013
 Beautiful (Vivian Green album) or the title song, 2010
 Beautiful: The Remix Album, by Blondie, 1995
 Beautiful: A Tribute to Gordon Lightfoot, a Gordon Lightfoot tribute album, 2003
 The Beautiful (album), by Triptych Myth, 2005
 Beautiful (EP), by Amber, or the title song, 2015

Songs
 "Beautiful" (10 Years song), 2008
 "Beautiful" (2PM song), 2012
 "Beautiful" (Akon song), 2009
 "Beautiful" (Bazzi song), 2017
 "Beautiful" (Carole King song), 1971
 "Beautiful" (Christina Aguilera song), 2002
 "Beautiful" (Disco Montego song), 2002
 "Beautiful" (Eminem song), 2009
 "Beautiful" (Enrique Iglesias song), 2014
 "Beautiful" (Gordon Lightfoot song), 1972
 "Beautiful" (Ivy song), 1995
 "Beautiful" (Jessica Mauboy song), 2013
 "Beautiful" (Joydrop song), 1998
 "Beautiful" (Lynsey de Paul song), 1977
 "Beautiful" (Mai Kuraki song), 2009
 "#Beautiful" (Mariah Carey song), 2013
 "Beautiful" (MercyMe song), 2010
 "Beautiful" (Miliyah Kato song), 2004
 "Beautiful" (Moby song), 2005
 "Beautiful" (Park Jung-min song), 2012
 "Beautiful" (Sarah De Bono song), 2012
 "Beautiful" (Snoop Dogg song), 2003
 "Beautiful" (Taylor Dayne song), 2007
 "Beautiful" (Wanna One song), 2017
 "Beautiful", by Aerosmith from Music from Another Dimension!, 2012
 "Beautiful", by Athlete from Vehicles & Animals, 2003
 "Beautiful", by Audio Adrenaline from Lift, 2001
 "Beautiful", by Barenaked Ladies from Barenaked Ladies Are Men, 2007
 "Beautiful", by Beast from Lights Go On Again, 2010
 "Beautiful", by Bethany Dillon from Bethany Dillon, 2004
 "Beautiful", by Betty Who from The Valley, 2017
 "Beautiful", by Bombay Rockers from Crash and Burn, 2007
 "Beautiful", by Carly Rae Jepsen, with Justin Bieber, from Kiss, 2012
 "Beautiful", by Cavo from Bright Nights Dark Days, 2009
 "Beautiful", by Cherrybelle from Love Is You, 2011
 "Beautiful", by Clean Bandit from What Is Love?, 2018
 "Beautiful", by Creed from Human Clay, 1999
 "Beautiful", by Damian Marley from Welcome to Jamrock, 2005
 "Beautiful", by Dan Bremnes from Where the Light Is, 2015
 "Beautiful", by Doja Cat from Purrr!, 2014
 "Beautiful", by Don Omar from Mas Flow: Los Benjamins, 2006
 "Beautiful", by Erika Jayne from Pretty Mess, 2009
 "Beautiful", by Goldfrapp from Supernature, 2005
 "Beautiful", by Gotthard from Silver, 2017
 "Beautiful", by Gustavo Cerati from Bocanada, 1999
 "Beautiful", by HIM from Deep Shadows and Brilliant Highlights, 2001
 "Beautiful", by Julian Lennon from Everything Changes, 2011
 "Beautiful", by Kygo from Golden Hour, 2020
 "Beautiful", by Lana Del Rey from Blue Banisters, 2021
 "Beautiful", by Lee & Leblanc (with Sook-Yin Lee), from the Shortbus soundtrack, 2006
 "Beautiful", by Mali Music from Mali Is..., 2014
 "Beautiful", by Mandalay from Empathy, 1998
 "Beautiful", by Marillion from Afraid of Sunlight, 1995
 "Beautiful", by Matt Darey, 2002
 "Beautiful", by Michelle Williams from Journey to Freedom, 2014
 "Beautiful", by NCT 2021 from Universe, 2021
 "Beautiful", by Paul Simon from Surprise, 2006
 "Beautiful", by Pop Evil from Onyx, 2013
 "Beautiful", by Rasmus Seebach, 2019
 "Beautiful", by Sevendust from Animosity, 2001
 "Beautiful", by Shinee from The Misconceptions of Us, 2013
 "Beautiful", by Social Code from A Year at the Movies, 2004
 "Beautiful", by the Smashing Pumpkins from Mellon Collie and the Infinite Sadness, 1995
 "Beautiful", by Verona, 2004
 "Beautiful", by Walker Hayes from Boom, 2017

See also
 Beautiful Garbage, a 2001 album by Garbage
 Biutiful, a 2010 Mexican-Spanish drama film
 "Biutyful", a 2021 song by Coldplay
 Beauty (disambiguation)
 Beautiful Girl (disambiguation)
 You're Beautiful (disambiguation)